WEHCO Media, Inc., based in Little Rock, AR is a privately held media company with holdings that include newspapers, cable television systems, and internet service. Walter E. Hussman, Jr. (born 1947), is the president. Hussmann is the grandson of Clyde E. Palmer, whose media holdings formed the basis of WEHCO Media. WEHCO is an acronym for Walter E. Hussman Company. 

The company publishes 10 daily newspapers serving three states, as well as eight English-language nondaily newspapers and two Spanish-language publications. They include the Arkansas Democrat-Gazette, the Texarkana Gazette, and the Chattanooga Times Free Press. Among the smaller papers in Arkansas are the Hot Springs Sentinel-Record, The Camden News, the Magnolia Banner-News, and the El Dorado News-Times. 

The company also operates cable television systems in Arkansas under the WEHCO Video division - Pine Bluff Cable TV in Pine Bluff, Resort TV Cable in Hot Springs, Cam-Tel Company in Camden, Hope Community TV in Hope, Prescott Video in Prescott, White County Video in Searcy, Augusta Video in Augusta  (Woodruff County) and East Arkansas Video in Forrest City.  In Texas - Longview Cable TV in Longview and Kilgore Video in Kilgore.  Also, WEHCO Video holdings include Vicksburg Video in Vicksburg, MS and Tahlequah Cable TV in Tahlequah, OK.

In years past, the company held several radio stations and a TV station. They included KCMC-AM (Texarkana, TX), KTAL-FM 98.1 (Texarkana, TX - Shreveport, LA), KTAL-TV (NBC) Channel 6 (Texarkana, TX - Shreveport, LA).  KCMC and KTAL-TV and FM continue to operate under different owners today. WEHCO Media also owned KAMD-910 AM and KWEH-97.1 FM in Camden, AR.  KWEH stood for the owners initials Walter E. Hussman).  KAMD ceased broadcasting on August 31, 1995, and KWEH-FM is now known as KAMD-FM, owned by Radio Works Inc. and Jay W. Bunyard.

In March 2008, WEHCO announced its purchase of three papers in Missouri: the Jefferson City News Tribune, the Fulton Sun (both dailies) and the California Democrat (a weekly).

In 2009, WEHCO merged its Northwest Arkansas media interests with Stephens Media to form the joint venture Northwest Arkansas Newspapers LLC. WEHCO acquired Stephens' half in 2016.

In August 2010, WEHCO and Righthaven LLC (a Las Vegas, Nevada based law firm) joined into an agreement for Righthaven to sue bloggers on WEHCO's behalf for copyright violations.

References

External links 
 

Mass media companies of the United States
Companies based in Little Rock, Arkansas
Companies based in Arkansas
Newspaper companies of the United States